Theta Doradus, Latinized from θ Doradus, is a solitary star in the southern constellation of  Dorado. Based upon an annual parallax shift of 6.64 mas as seen from Earth, it is located around 490 light years from the Sun. With an apparent visual magnitude of +4.82, the star is bright enough to be faintly visible to the naked eye.

With an age of around 1.17 billion years, it has an estimated 2.23 times the mass of the Sun and has expanded to about 16 times the Sun's radius. It is radiating 426.6 times the solar luminosity from its photosphere at an effective temperature of 4,320 K.

Naming

References

K-type giants
Dorado (constellation)
Doradus, Theta
Durchmusterung objects
034649
024372
1744